Mulan Joins the Army may refer to:

 Mulan Joins the Army (play)
 Mulan Joins the Army (1928 film)
 Mulan Joins the Army (1939 film)
Hua Mulan Joins the Army, a 1927 film by Tianyi Film Company

See also
Hua Mulan (disambiguation)
Mulan (disambiguation)